Futbol Club Barcelona Juvenil are the under-19 team of Spanish professional football club Barcelona and the final stage of progression in the club's youth academy commonly referred to as La Masia. The Juvenil team play in the Group III of the División de Honor Juvenil de Fútbol where their main rivals are Espanyol, Damm and Mallorca. 

They also participate in the national Copa de Campeones Juvenil and the Copa del Rey Juvenil, qualification for which is dependent on final league group position, and have taken part in the continental UEFA Youth League which they won in 2014 and 2018.

Juvenil A

Current squad

Out on loan

Season to season (Juvenil A) 
Seasons with two or more trophies shown in bold

Superliga / Liga de Honor sub-19

División de Honor Juvenil

Honours 
Domestic competitions
Superliga / Liga de Honor sub-19: 1
1994
Copa de Campeones: 4
 2005, 2009, 2011, 2022
 División de Honor (regional): 14
 2000, 2001, 2005, 2006, 2009, 2010, 2011, 2013, 2014,2017, 2018, 2020, 2021, 2022
 Copa del Rey: 18
 1951, 1959, 1973, 1974, 1975, 1976, 1977, 1980, 1986,1987, 1989, 1994, 1996, 2000, 2002, 2005, 2006, 2011

European competitions
 UEFA Youth League: 2
 2014, 2018

Juvenil B

Current squad

Out on loan

Current technical staff

See also 
La Masia
FC Barcelona B
FC Barcelona C

References 

youth
Barcelona
Barcelona
Barcelona
Barcelona